Lophostachys montana is a plant native to the Cerrado vegetation of Brazil. This plant is cited in Flora Brasiliensis by Carl Friedrich Philipp von Martius. The Latin specific epithet montana refers to mountains or coming from mountains.

References

External links
  Flora Brasiliensis: Lophostachys montana

montana
Flora of Brazil
Plants described in 1847